CFU-Baso is a colony forming unit. that gives rise to basophils. Some sources use the term "CFU-Bas".

References 

Colony forming units
Blood cells